Yongsan station is a major railway station in Seoul, South Korea. It is located in Yongsan District, and adjoins the Yongsan Electronics Market. The station is the terminus for high-speed and long-distance trains on a number of railway lines, including most trains on the Honam Line, its high-speed counterpart, and all trains on the Janghang and Jeolla Lines.

Prior to 2004, all long-distance trains serving Seoul terminated at the nearby Seoul Station, but with the opening of the Korea Train Express (KTX), Yongsan Station took over some of Seoul's services.

On February 28, 2012, ITX-Cheongchun trains began service between this station and Chuncheon station on the Gyeongchun Line.

Yongsan station is also served by metro rail on Line 1 and the Gyeongui Jungang Line on the Seoul Metropolitan Subway.

In 2004, a major cinema opened adjacent to the station. In August 2006, the whole station building was made into a large department store, called I'Park Mall.  The building now includes the railway station, subway station, the CGV cinema and several restaurants and shops, as well as housing the first building of the Yongsan Electronics Market. There is a bridge connecting I'Park Mall and the Yongsan Electronics Market. On floors B-1 and B-2 there is a very large E-Mart store along with a food court and a Burger King restaurant.
In the higher floors some of the restaurants include: Uno Chicago Grill, KFC, Lotteria, California Pizza Kitchen, Pizza Hut, and many Korean and Japanese restaurants. Other outlets, such as Starbucks, Dunkin' Donuts, and Baskin Robbins, are also available. A duty-free store operated by HDC Shilla opened its doors in 2016, and the entire I'Park Mall underwent a major expansion in 2017.

The station is scheduled to become a transfer station with the Shinbundang Line in 2025. Once the Shinbundang Station becomes operational, Yongsan Station will become connected with Sinyongsan Station on Line 4.

Station layout 
Yongsan Station has six elevated island platforms and one side platform serving 13 tracks.

Platforms

Gallery

See also
Transportation in South Korea
Korail
Korea Train Express
Yongsan bombing

References

Metro stations in Yongsan District
Railway stations in Seoul
Korea Train Express stations
Railway stations in Korea opened in 1905
Seoul Metropolitan Subway stations
Gyeongbu Line
Yongsan Line
Gyeongwon Line
Gyeongui–Jungang Line
Seoul Subway Line 1
Shinbundang Line